Sebastiao Mazarelo was an Indian politician and medical practitioner from Goa. He was the first member of the Goa, Daman and Diu Legislative Assembly from the Cuncolim Assembly constituency. He served for five years, from 1963 to 1967. He was also one of the notable individuals that played a pivotal role in the Goa Opinion Poll.

Early and personal life
Sebastiao Mazarelo was born at Goreamorod, Velim. He had a son, Wilson Benigno Duarte Mazarello, a former footballer and medical practitioner, who played for Associacao Academica de Goa. On 31 December 2020, ailing to his health, he died in London, aged 79.

References

Goa, Daman and Diu MLAs 1963–1967
People from South Goa district
United Goans Party politicians
Year of birth missing
Year of death missing
20th-century Indian politicians